Akkayapalem is a census town in Visakhapatnam district  in the state of Andhra Pradesh, India.

Demographics
 India census, Akkayapalle had a population of 18,247. Males constitute 51% of the population and females 49%. Akkayapalle has an average literacy rate of 62%, higher than the national average of 59.5%; with 58% of the males and 42% of females literate. 14% of the population is under 6 years of age.

References

Villages in Kadapa district